Derek Williams (20 August 1929 – 2 August 2021) was a British documentary film director and writer who was active from the 1950s until 1990.  His films received four British Academy of Film and Television Arts (BAFTAs) and five Oscar nominations (four as director and writer and one as writer only) all in the short documentary classification.

Early life and education
Born in Newcastle upon Tyne, he was educated at Newcastle Royal Grammar School and Corpus Christi College, Cambridge.

Film career
His first film, Hadrian's Wall, was made while he was at university and was self-financed. On the basis of this film he was able to enter the film industry as a trainee assistant for World Wide Films.  His first commercial film, released in 1955, was Oil Harbour, Aden, made for the sponsor George Wimpey & Co who had the contract to build a port to service a nearby oil refinery being built by BP.  Williams acted as cameraman as well as writer and director during the two year location filming.

His first big break came in 1955 when World Wide Films was appointed by BP to film the British Trans-Antarctic Expedition, under Dr Vivian Fuchs, which BP was sponsoring.  Williams became a member of the sixteen-person party the sailed to the Weddell Sea aboard Theron with the intention of establishing an advance base for the main party due to arrive the following year.  During the outward journey the ship became frozen is sea ice and also had to depart more rapidly than originally intended, having deposited the shore party who were to stay through the Antarctic winter.  The resulting film, Foothold on Antarctica, was released in 1956.  It received a private viewing at Buckingham Palace and went on to receive an Oscar nomination.  The film was also shown on a number of occasions as part of public events which included a talk from Sir Vivian Fuchs and which raised private donations towards the costs of the expedition.

His next film, Oxford, made in 1956, was commissioned by the Central Office of Information as part of their efforts to attract overseas students.

In 1957 Williams moved from World Wide Films to Greenpark Films.  He wrote and directed From the Good Earth in 1957 under the sponsorship of Hovis.  This was followed by There Was a Door (1957), which looked at the care of the severely learning disabled and was sponsored by the Manchester Regional Hospital Board.  This film represented his first social subject, an area that the British documentary film industry since the 1930s had had a strong track record.  The film was subsequently televised by the BBC.  In 1959 he made The Road to MIS, a film sponsored by BP to mark its fiftieth anniversary.  Following The Road to MIS, Derek Williams became a freelance director and writer.

Subsequent films were Bank of England (1960), Hunted in Holland (1961), The Cattle Carters (1962) and Treasure in Malta (1963), the latter three films being drama documentaries. Hunted in Holland and Treasure in Malta were frequently shown to Saturday morning children's film audiences in the 1960s, and The Cattle Carters was frequently shown on BBC2 as a Trade Test Colour Film.

In 1962 Derek Williams accepted an offer from Films of Scotland to direct a film to commemorate the centennial of Glasgow's appointment of its first Medical Officer for Health.  Williams' candid attempts to portray the Glasgow of the times brought him into conflict with John Grierson of Films of Scotland, who wanted a more positive portrayal of Glasgow.  Williams was not credited on the release of the finished film, Health of a City (1965).

His next film was sponsored by BP about their attempts to find oil in northern Alaska.  The film was released as North Slope - Alaska in 1964 and is notable for its music composed by the composer Edward Williams. His subsequent films were also sponsored by BP. I Do - And I Understand (1964) was on behalf of the Nuffield Maths Project and won a Society of Film and Television Arts (SFTA, the predecessor to BAFTA) award.  Turkey the Bridge focused on Turkeys historical and cultural heritage.  It was edited by Kevin Brownlow and was Oscar-nominated.  His next film, having worked on but not been credited for North Sea Quest (1967), was Algerian Pipeline (1967), made for John Brown Ltd, who were building a pipeline.

1967 also saw the making of Indus Waters sponsored by The World Bank and with original music composed by Wilfred Joseph.  The film looked at a project undertaken under an Indo-Pakistani treaty to mutually harness the waters of the Indus for agriculture.  This film also won an SFTA award (in 1968).

In 1969, rejoining Greenpark Films, Williams made The Taking Mood for BP New Zealand, another small scale dramatic piece.  This was to be Derek Williams' last dramatic film which proved not to be his strongest genre.

Arguably his most important and widely recognised film was to follow in 1970.  Entitled The Shadow of Progress and sponsored by BP, the film was an early example of the environmental movement.  The film exposed the consequences of industrialisation, particularly with regard to pollution, though coming prior to the identification of global warming, its focus is more on the visual impact and damage to wildlife and the lived environment. Over 1,900 copies of the film were printed and circulated in a number of languages and the film was twice shown by the BBC on prime time.

The following year he made Alaska - The Great Land again under BP sponsorship focusing on the history, wildlife and culture of Alaska. Edward Williams was the composer of the music.  The film resulted in Derek Williams' last SFTA award.

In 1972, he made The Tide of Traffic under BP sponsorship, part of a planned three part series (The Shadow of Progress, The Tide of Traffic and a scripted but never made film on the issues created by population growth).  The Tide of Traffic was about the impact of the car, particularly in terms of its damage to the urban environment.  The film received an Oscar nomination and a Venice Golden Mercury.

In 1973 he made Scotland, a film sponsored by BP and focused on the history and culture of Scotland.  His last film for Greenpark was made the following year.  A Heritage to Build On, released in 1975, was sponsored by the Cement and Concrete Association.  He wrote the script for The End of the Road (1976) about Alaska, which went on to receive an Oscar nomination.

By now the British documentary industry was in rapid decline with the growing strength of television and the dwindling availability of industrial sponsorship, particularly following the 1973 oil shock.  However, in his last significant budget film, The Shetland Experience, Williams worked under the sponsorship of the Sullom Voe Association to record the history, nature and culture of Shetland as the oil began to come ashore to Sullom Voe Terminal. The film was Oscar-nominated and Williams was able to attend the Oscar ceremony in Los Angeles for the only time.

In 1979 he made Planet Water for BP, though on a much more limited budget than the films of the early 1970s.  The film focused on the problems of access to water and covered some of the theme which were to be part of the unmade film on population growth.

Most of his remaining films reflected the declining sponsorship available and were of a more obviously commercial nature.  These include The Science of Art (1976) for Winsor & Newton, The Chemistry of India (1979) for ICI, Army Cadet (1980) and an army recruitment film, South East Pipeline (1982) for Esso, Fair Wear and Tear (1982) for BP, Diamond Day (1982) for De Beers, Configuration Management (1985) and Replenishment at Sea (1986) for the UK Armed Forces.

In 1990 he made A Stake in the Soil, his first sponsorship by Shell's film unit and focused on the environmental theme of the exhaustion of soil by intensive farming. A second Shell sponsorship followed, Oman - Tracts of Time (1992), which won the Chicago International Film Festival Award for best documentary, a film requested by the Sultan on Oman, with the score composed by Charles Hart.  During the making of the film Williams suffered from (temporary) ill health which was to bring to a close his film-making career at the age of 62.

Retirement and legacy
In his retirement, Williams wrote and published two books on Roman history with a third unpublished.

Derek Williams' films and the awards and nominations they received made him one of the leading post-war UK documentary film directors. He was the subject of a retrospective at the British Film Institute on 6 December 2010.

Personal life and death
He married Olive Minnie Warren on 19 November 1960.  They lived in Kent, England from 1961.

Williams died on 2 August 2021, at the age of 91.

References 

Shadows of Progress: Documentary Film in Post-war Britain edited by Patrick Russell and James Piers Taylor. A British Film Institute publication by Palgrave Macmillan 2010

External links
 

1929 births
2021 deaths
People from Newcastle upon Tyne